Events from the year 1978 in Jordan.

Incumbents
Monarch: Hussein 
Prime Minister: Mudar Badran

Events

Births

28 June - Ayman Adais.

Deaths

El-Amiri.

See also

 Years in Iraq
 Years in Syria
 Years in Saudi Arabia

References

 
1970s in Jordan
Jordan
Jordan
Years of the 20th century in Jordan